Fords is a locality in the Mid North region of South Australia, southwest of Kapunda, South Australia. It is crossed by the Thiele Highway, and the former Morgan railway line. The northern boundary of Fords is the Light River. Fords is named after an early landowner, John Ford.

References

Towns in South Australia